Shanghai Airport may refer to one of these airports serving Shanghai, China:

 Shanghai Pudong International Airport
 Shanghai Hongqiao International Airport